Death in the Afternoon is a non-fiction book written by Ernest Hemingway  about the ceremony and traditions of Spanish bullfighting, published in 1932.  The book provides a look at the history and the Spanish traditions of bullfighting. It also contains a deeper contemplation on the nature of fear and courage. While essentially a guide book, there are three main sections: Hemingway's work, pictures, and a glossary of terms.

Contents 

Hemingway became a bullfighting aficionado  after seeing the Pamplona fiesta in the 1920s, which he wrote about in The Sun Also Rises. In Death in the Afternoon, Hemingway explores the metaphysics of bullfighting—the ritualized, almost religious practice—that he considered analogous to the writer's search for meaning and the essence of life. In bullfighting, he found the elemental nature of life and death. Marianne Wiggins has written of Death in the Afternoon: "Read it for the writing, for the way it's told... He'll make you like it [bullfighting]... You read enough and long enough, he'll make you love it, he's relentless".

In his writings on Spain, Hemingway was influenced by the Spanish master Pío Baroja. When Hemingway won the Nobel Prize, he traveled to see Baroja, then on his death bed, specifically to tell him he thought Baroja deserved the prize more than he. 

Death in the Afternoon was published by Scribner's on 23 September 1932 to a first edition print run of approximately 10,000 copies.

Notes

References

"Death in the Afternoon – A Literary Cocktail" Retrieved July 4, 2010.

External links 
 
 Hemingway Archives, John F. Kennedy Library

1932 non-fiction books
American sports novels
Books by Ernest Hemingway
Bullfighting books
Cattle in literature
Charles Scribner's Sons books